The State Journal is a midsize daily broadsheet newspaper mainly serving Frankfort, the capital of Kentucky, and Franklin County.  the paper prints Tuesday through Friday plus one weekend edition. and has a circulation of 6,100–7,300.

Due to financial stresses during the COVID-19 pandemic, the newspaper reduced their print schedule to twice a week and beefed up their online delivery and services.

The editor Chanda Veno, who has held the position since December 2018, is the first female editor in the paper's lengthy history (founded in 1900). Carl West, a graduate of University of Kentucky (1966) and member of the Kentucky Journalism Hall of Fame (2003), was the longtime editor of the newspaper, serving from 1979 to 2012.



History

In 1900, John Meloan established The Kentucky State Journal, an eight-page, six-column Democratic morning daily. In 1908, Graham Vreeland established the Frankfort News. In 1911, both papers united to become The Frankfort News-Journal and was renamed The State Journal in 1912.

The Perry family ran the newspaper up until 1962, when it was bought by the Dix family of Wooster, Ohio. Operating as Frankfort Publishing Co., L.L.C., a subsidiary of Dix Communications, Albert E. Dix was publisher, followed by his children Troy Dix and Ann Dix Maenza through 2015. At that time, the paper was purchased by Frankfort Newsmedia LLC, an affiliate of Boone Newspapers Inc.

References

Jillson, Willard Rouse. The Newspapers and Periodicals of Frankfort, Kentucky 1795–1945. Published 1945. Kentucky State Historical Society, Frankfort, Kentucky. Print.

External links
 

Newspapers published in Kentucky
Frankfort, Kentucky
1900 establishments in Kentucky
Newspapers established in 1900